Al-Qiri or al-Jiri, is a subject of Baladiyah al-Batha and is one of the oldest neighborhoods of Riyadh, Saudi Arabia. It shares close proximity to al-Dirah and Jabrah neighborhoods. It is named after the al-Qiri Gate of the former city wall.

References 

Neighbourhoods in Riyadh